Ivana Popović (born 20 February 1989) is a Serbian publisher, entrepreneur, and politician. She has served two terms in the National Assembly of Serbia as a member of the Serbian Progressive Party (Srpska napredna stranka, SNS).

Early life and private career
Popović was born in Belgrade, in what was then the Socialist Republic of Serbia in the Socialist Federal Republic of Yugoslavia. She holds a bachelor's degree as an economist and has been the marketing manager of the journals Ona and Černogorija. She is now based at her family's property in Kržava, in the Krupanj municipality of western Serbia, and is the founder of the Džemara company, which specializes in jams and produces sauces, spices, and other food products. She was awarded the cup for innovation in agribusiness at the 86th Annual Agricultural Fair in Novi Sad in 2019.

Politician

Parliamentarian
Popović was given the fifth position on the Progressive Party's Aleksandar Vučić — For Our Children list in the 2020 Serbian parliamentary election. This was tantamount to election, and she was indeed elected when the list won a landslide majority with 188 out of 250 mandates. During the campaign, she said that her priorities would be small entrepreneurs, youth issues, and ensuring youth have a reason to remain in Serbia.

During her first parliamentary term, Popović was a member of the culture and information committee and the committee on the economy, regional development, trade, tourism, and energy; a deputy member of the agriculture, forestry, and water management committee; a member of Serbia's delegation to the Inter-Parliamentary Union; the leader of Serbia's parliamentary friendship group with South Korea; and a member of the parliamentary friendship groups with Australia, Austria, China, the Czech Republic, Germany, Hungary,  Japan, Qatar, Russia, Saudi Arabia, Turkey, the United Arab Emirates, the United Kingdom, and the United States of America.

Popović received the 129th position on the SNS's Together We Can Do Everything list in the 2022 Serbian parliamentary election. The list won a plurality victory with 120 seats, and she was not immediately re-elected. She was given a new mandate on 26 October 2022 as the replacement for another party member but resigned just over a month later, on 28 November 2022.

Municipal politics
Popović received the fifth position the Progressive Party's electoral list for the Krupanj municipal assembly in the 2020 Serbian local elections (which were held concurrently with the parliamentary election) and was elected when the list won a majority victory with twenty-five out of thirty-five mandates.

References

1989 births
Living people
Politicians from Belgrade
People from Krupanj
Members of the National Assembly (Serbia)
Delegates to the Inter-Parliamentary Union Assembly
Serbian Progressive Party politicians
Women members of the National Assembly (Serbia)